Lin Guipu (born 21 April 1997) is a Chinese badminton player.

Achievements

Youth Olympic Games 
Boys' singles

BWF World Junior Championships 
Boys' singles

Asian Youth Games 
Boys' singles

Asian Junior Championships 
Boys' singles

BWF International Challenge/Series 
Men's singles

  BWF International Challenge tournament
  BWF International Series tournament

References

External links 
 

1997 births
Living people
Chinese male badminton players
Sportspeople from Wenzhou
Badminton players from Zhejiang
Badminton players at the 2014 Summer Youth Olympics
21st-century Chinese people